Lake Ptuj is a reservoir on the Drava River southeast of the town of Ptuj in eastern Slovenia. It is the largest reservoir in Slovenia and was created in 1978 when a dam for the Formin hydroelectric power plant was built on the Drava. It is still used as the reservoir for the power plant, but is also popular for rowing, sailing, and fishing.

References
 Firbas, Peter: Vsa slovenska jezera : leksikon slovenskih stoječih voda. DZS, Ljubljana  2001

External links

Lake Ptuj on Geopedia

Ptuj
Drava basin
Wetlands of Slovenia